Herzsprung is a German surname. Notable people with the surname include:

 Bernd Herzsprung (born 1942), German actor
 Hannah Herzsprung (born 1981), German actress, daughter of Bernd

German-language surnames